Pomona is an unincorporated community in Kent County, Maryland, United States. It is located at the intersection of MD-289 (Quaker Neck Road) and Pomona Road, 4.5 miles southwest of Chestertown. Pomona is home to the last remaining country store in Kent County.

Clark's Conveniency was listed on the National Register of Historic Places in 1975.

References

Unincorporated communities in Maryland
Unincorporated communities in Kent County, Maryland